Zachary Mills is the name of:

Zach Mills (born 1995), American actor
Zack Mills (born 1982), American football quarterback
Zak Mills (born 1992), English footballer